Visa requirements for Mozambican citizens are administrative entry restrictions by the authorities of other states placed on citizens of Mozambique. As of 2 July 2019, Mozambican citizens had visa-free or visa on arrival access to 58 countries and territories, ranking the Mozambican passport 85th in terms of travel freedom according to the Henley Passport Index.

Visa requirements map

Visa requirements

Dependent, Disputed, or Restricted territories
Unrecognized or partially recognized countries

Dependent and autonomous territories

Vaccination
Many African countries, including Angola, Benin, Burkina Faso, Cameroon, Central African Republic, Chad, Democratic Republic of the Congo, Republic of the Congo, Côte d'Ivoire, Equatorial Guinea, Gabon, Ghana, Guinea, Liberia, Mali, Mauritania, Niger, Rwanda, São Tomé and Príncipe, Senegal, Sierra Leone, Uganda, Zambia require all incoming passengers to have a current International Certificate of Vaccination. Some other countries require vaccination only if the passenger is coming from an infected area.

Passport validity
Many countries require passport validity of no less than 6 months and one or two blank pages.

Non-visa restrictions

See also

Visa policy of Mozambique
Mozambican passport

References and Notes
References

Notes

Mozambique
Foreign relations of Mozambique